Knínice may refer to places in the Czech Republic:

Knínice (Blansko District), a market town in the South Moravian Region
Knínice (Jihlava District), a municipality and village in the Vysočina Region
Knínice, a village and part of Libouchec in the Ústí nad Labem Region
Knínice, a village and part of Lovečkovice in the Ústí nad Labem Region
Knínice, a village and part of Žlutice in the Karlovy Vary Region
Miroslavské Knínice, a municipality and village in the South Moravian Region
Moravské Knínice, a municipality and village in the South Moravian Region
Veverské Knínice, a municipality and village in the South Moravian Region

See also
Konice
House of Kinsky